Shali (pronounced ) is a village (selo) in Pestrechinsky District of the Republic of Tatarstan, Russia, situated  south of Pestretsy, the administrative center of the district.

The village is situated on the M7 highway. Shali's population was 3,131 in 1989, 2,980 in 2000; mostly ethnic Tatars (as on 1989). The main occupation of the residents is agriculture and cattle breeding. There is a secondary school, a cultural centre, a clinic, and a mosque, dating back to the end of the 19th century.

It was founded in the Khanate of Kazan epoch.

Russia's Grand Mufti Rawil Gaynetdin was born here in 1959.

References

Rural localities in Tatarstan
Laishevsky Uyezd